This is a list of the five national teams who played the 1975 Rugby League World Cup.

Australia
Graeme Langlands (Captain/Coach)
Chris Anderson  
Arthur Beetson 
Ray Branighan
John Brass 
Ron Coote  
Mick Cronin
John Donnelly 
Graham Eadie
Terry Fahey
Denis Fitzgerald
Bob Fulton
Mark Harris 
Ray Higgs
John Lang 
Ian Mackay
Allan McMahon
John Mayes
John O'Neill
John Peard
Tim Pickup
Greg Pierce 
George Piggins
Lew Platz
Jim Porter
John Quayle
Terry Randall
Tommy Raudonikis
Johnny Rhodes
Steve Rogers 
Paul Sait  
Ian Schubert
Gary Stevens 
Ross Strudwick 
Greg Veivers 
David Wright

New Zealand
Coach: George Menzies
Ken Stirling (c) 
Murray Eade (vc) 
Fred Ah Kuoi 
Kevin Barry  
Ray Baxendale 
Les Beehre 
Mocky Brereton 
Tony Coll 
Warren Collicoat   
Tom Conroy
Bruce Dickison 
Barrie Dyer 
Tony Gordon  
John Greengrass  
Peter Gurnick 
John Hibbs  
Bob Jarvis  
Josh Liavaa  
Paul Matete  
Don Munro 
John O'Sullivan  
Kevin Potter 
Lyndsay Proctor  
John Smith  
Dane Sorensen 
Kurt Sorensen
Graeme West
John Whittaker  
Dennis Williams 
John Wright 
Murray Wright

France
Coach:Antoine Jimenez
Yves Alvernhe 	 (Albi)
Michel Anglade	(Saint-Gaudens) 
Elie Bonal	(Carcassonne)
Jean-Marie Bosc	(Saint-Estève)
Guy Bucchi	 (Marseille)
José Calle	 (Saint-Estève)
Michel Cassin	 (Tonneins)
Jean-Louis Castel  (Carcassonne)	 
Patrick Chauvet	(Bordeaux)
Philippe Clergeau (Bordeaux) 
Bernard Curt  (Toulouse)
Maurice de Matos  (Toulouse)
Francis de Nadaï  (Limoux) 
André Dumas	 (Lézignan)
Francis Duthill  (Bordeaux)
Guy Garcia  (Carcassonne)
Serge Gleyzes	(Carcassonne)
Antoine Gonzalez  (Villeneuve-sur-Lot)
Michel Gonzalez (Pamiers)
Jean-Francois Grechi (Limoux)
Bernard Guilhem	 (Carcassonne)
Didier Hermet	 (Villeneuve-sur-Lot)
Jean-Marie Imbert  (Avignon)
Fernand Kaminski (Albi)
Jean-Pierre Lacoste (Bordeaux)
Michel Laffargue 	(Tonneins)
Michel Maïque	 (Lézignan)
Jean-Claude Mayorgas  (Toulouse) 
Michel Molinier  (Saint-Gaudens)
Michel Moussard 	 (Albi)
Marcel Pillon 	(Saint-Estève)
André Ruiz 	 (Pau)
Jean-Paul Sauret (XIII Catalan)
Victor Serrano	 (Saint-Gaudens)
René Terrats 	 (Saint-Estève)
Charles Thénégal  (Toulouse)
Francis Tranier	(Saint-Gaudens) 
Jean-Pierre Tremouille (Tonneins)
Guy Vigouroux (Cavaillon)
Charles Zalduendo (Toulouse)

England
Coaches: William "Bill" Oxley Coach Alex Murphy

Roger Millward (c)
Michael "Mick" Adams
John Atkinson
Harry Beverley
John Keith Bridges
Paul Charlton
David "Dave" Chisnall
Eric Chisnall
Philip "Phil" Cookson
Michael "Mike" Coulman
Ged Dunn
Ray Dutton
Leslie "Les" Dyl
David "Dave" Eckersley
George Fairbairn
Stanley "Stan" Fearnley
Keith Fielding
Colin Forsyth
Ken Gill
Parry Gordon
John Gray
Jeff Grayshon
Brian Hogan
John Holmes
Eric Hughes
Bob Irving
Phil Jackson
Thomas "Tommy" Martyn
Mick Morgan
Steve Nash
George Nicholls
Derek Noonan
Steve 'Knocker' Norton
Barry Philbin
David "Dave" Redfearn
Alan Smith
Nigel Stephenson
James "Jimmy" Thompson
John Walsh
Stuart Wright

Wales
Coaches: R. Simpson and Les Pearce

David Watkins (c)
Peter Banner
John Bevan
Brian Butler
Kel Coslett
Eddie Cunningham
Colin Dixon
Dick Evans
Tony Fisher
Bill Francis
Stuart Gallacher
Brian Gregory
Mel James
Clive Jones
John Mantle
Roy Mathias
'Big' Jim Mills
Mick Murphy
Mike Nicholas
Maurice Richards
Peter Rowe
Clive Sullivan
David Treasure
Glyn Turner
Richard Wallace
Bobby Wanbon
David Willicombe
Frank Wilson

External links
World Championship Series 1975 at Rugbyleagueproject.org

1975 in rugby league
Rugby League World Cup squads